Club Deportivo Gerardo Barrios  is a Salvadoran professional football club based in San Rafael Oriente,  El Salvador.

The club currently plays in the Segunda División de Fútbol Salvadoreño, after being promoted as the third best team of the  Tercera Division de Fútbol Salvadoreño.

The club previously went by Universidad de Gerardo Barrios.

Stadium
Gerardo Barrios plays its home games at Cancha La Mercad in San Rafael Oriente. However the club stated the Cancha La Mercad was to small to play in the primera division therefore they moved their games to the bigger Estadio Cesar Antonio Angulo.

 Cancha La Merced (−2019)
 Estadio Cesar Antonio Angulo (2019–)
 Cancha Municipal de San Rafael Oriente

Honours

Domestic honours
 Segunda División Salvadorean and predecessors 
 Champions (0) : TBD
 Tercera División Salvadorean and predecessors 
 Champions:(1) :2018
 Liga ADFAS and predecessors 
 Champions:(1) :2017

Club Records

Top goalscorers 

<small>Note: Players in bold text are still active with Gerardo Barrios </small>

Current squadAs of: October 2021''

Non-playing staff

Coaching staff

List of coaches
  Nelson Antonio Granados (2017) 
  Salvador Coreas Privado (2018)
  Victor Fuentos (2018)
  Efrain Solano (June 2019 – 2020)
  Ervin Loza (2020–21) 
  Miguel Angel Aguilar Obando (Oct 2021-)

References

External links
 

Football clubs in El Salvador